Pelicano Airport ,  is a desert airport near Estación Chañar, La Higuera, in the Coquimbo Region of Chile.

The airport serves the astronomy community of the Las Campanas Observatory, one of the high elevation observatories in the Atacama Desert.

The runway has an additional  of gravel overrun on the south end, which then drops into a canyon.

See also

Transport in Chile
List of airports in Chile

References

External links
OpenStreetMap - Pelicano
SkyVector - Pelicano
FallingRain - Pelicano Airport

Airports in Chile
Airports in Coquimbo Region